The Natalbany River drains into Lake Maurepas in Louisiana in the United States.

Etymology
It is speculated that the name of the river is derived from the Choctaw words nita meaning bear and abani which means "to cook over a fire" in the Choctaw language.

References

See also
2016 Louisiana floods
List of Louisiana rivers

Rivers of Louisiana
Bodies of water of St. Helena Parish, Louisiana
Bodies of water of Livingston Parish, Louisiana
Tributaries of Lake Maurepas